Danny Porte (born 18 June 1975 in England) is an English former rugby union player who played for Glasgow Warriors at the Tighthead Prop position.

Porte began rugby playing for school team Dover Grammar. He left the school to go to Exeter University where he played rugby for the University team and was in the winning Exeter University team in the British University Sports Association final against Northumbria at Twickenham.

Porte began his professional career with Glasgow Warriors in 1996. He was on the bench for Glasgow's European Conference match against  Montferrand on 19 October 1996; and was on the bench for Glasgow's game against Newport RFC on 28 October 1996. He came off the bench for Glasgow in their Heineken Cup home match against London Wasps in Season 1997-98.

At the time he was playing for amateur side Glasgow Academicals before they merged with Glasgow High Kelvinside.  Porte then played for the merged team Glasgow Hawks.

In 1998 he joined Watsonians RFC.

He played for Waterloo in 2000.

He played for Exeter Chiefs gaining over 100 caps for the club.

In 2004, he was a teacher for Devon County Council.

He moved to the Cayman Islands in 2006 where he had a spell teaching.

He also had a stint in France.

In 2008 he played for Launceston however he was released by them in January 2009.

He joined Plymouth Albion in January 2009.

He played for the Barbarians in 2009 against a Combined Services team.

He played for Newton Abbot in 2011.

Porte left Newton Abbot RFC to go to New Zealand in the Summer of 2013. Porte is now coaching in Christchurch, New Zealand for Christchurch Boys' High School.

References

External links
  Statsbunker profile

Living people
English rugby union players
Glasgow Warriors players
Glasgow Academicals rugby union players
Watsonians RFC players
1975 births
Rugby union props